Statistics of the International Soccer League for the 1926 season.

League standings

References
INTERNATIONAL SOCCER LEAGUE I (RSSSF)

Inter
American soccer friendly trophies
Canadian soccer friendly trophies
1926 in Canadian soccer